Nikita Alexeyevich Struve (16 February 1931 – 7 May 2016) was a French author and translator of Russian descent, specializing in the study of Russian émigrés.

Biography
Struve was part of the Struve family being the grandson of Peter Berngardovich Struve and the son of Aleksey Petrovich Struve (+ 1976), founder of an important Russian library at Paris. He was born in Boulogne-Billancourt, a suburb of Paris, He graduated from and taught Russian at the Sorbonne in the 1950s. In 1963, Struve published a book dedicated to the history of the Church under the Soviet regime ( «Les chrétiens en URSS»). This book has been translated into 5 languages. In 1979 Struve defended his doctoral dissertation on Osip Mandelstam (published in French, then - in the author's translation in Russian). In the same year he became a full professor at the University of Paris X (Nanterre), and later head of the Department of Slavic Studies.

In 1978 he headed the Russian section of the YMCA Press publisher. In 1991 he opened the publishing house "Russian way" in Moscow. He translated into French the poetry of Pushkin, Lermontov, Afanasy Fet, Akhmatova and other Russian poets. In 1996 he wrote the fundamental study "70 years of the Russian emigration". He was a member of the Board of Trustees of the  St. Filaret Orthodox Christian Institute, Professor of the University of Paris-Nanterre, Chief editor of "Bulletin of Russian Christian Movement" magazine and «Le messager orthodoxe».

A great influence on Struve as a researcher of the history of Russian culture was his private familiarity with Ivan Bunin, Alexei Remizov, Boris Zaitsev, Semyon Frank, Anna Akhmatova and Aleksandr Solzhenitsyn.

Family

Awards

Pushkin Medal - 2008, for achievements in Franco-Russian relations in culture and education 
 State Prize of the Russian Federation for literature and the arts; 1999
 Medal of the Russian Commissioner for Human Rights; 2011

Works

French language
 Les chrétiens en URSS. — Paris: Seuil, 1963. — 374 p. (2-e ed.: Paris, 1964. — 428 p.)
 Anthologie de la poésie russe. La Renaissance du XXe siècle. Introduction, choix, traduction et notes. — Paris, 1970. — 254 p. (2-e ed.: Paris, 1991).
 Ossip Mandelstam: la voix, l'idée, le destin. — Paris, 1982. — 302 p.
 Anthologie de la poésie russe du XIXe siècle. Introduction, choix, traduction et notes. — Paris, 1994. — 260 p.
 Soixante-dix ans d'émigration russe (1919–1989). — Paris, 1996. — 302 p.

Russian language
 Осип Мандельштам. — Лондон, 1988. — 336 с. (2-е изд.: Лондон, 1990; 3-е изд.: Томск, 1992; 4-е изд.: М., 2011).
 Православие и культура. — М.: Христианск. изд-во, 1992. — 337 с. (2-е изд., испр. и доп.: М.: Русский путь, 2000. — 632 с.)

This article is translated from Russian Language Wikipedia

1931 births
2016 deaths
French people of Russian descent
Russian people of German descent
Nikita
Recipients of the Medal of Pushkin